Adil Farid Mohammed Ghulam Nabi Mansuri (18 May 1936 – 6 November 2008) was an Indian poet, playwright, and calligrapher, primarily responsible for the development of modern Gujarati ghazal poetry and plays. He wrote in several languages, namely, Gujarati, Hindi, and Urdu.

Life
Adil Mansuri was born in Ahmedabad on 18 May 1936. He completed his primary education from Premchand Raichand Training College, Ahmedabad. He completed his secondary education from J. L. New English School, Ahmedabad and Metropolitan Highschool, Karachi. He completed matriculation. He tried his hand on several businesses. He worked at his father's cloth shop in Karachi and later at business of cotton and clothes in Ahmedabad. He also worked as journalist with English Topic and Gujarati Angana magazines. He was copywriter of advertising agency Shilpi in 1972. He left India and moved to United States. He died in New Jersey, US on 6 November 2008.

Works
He was interested in experimental forms of ghazal. Valank (1963), Pagarav (1966), Satat (1970), New York Naame Gam, Male Na Male (1996, 2006), Gazalna Aynagharma (2003) are his ghazal collections. Though he wrote poetry in several other forms, he is chiefly known for his ghazals. His ghazals are influenced by Urdu ghazals. He wrote ghazals in Gujarati, Hindi and Urdu with free use of words of one language in other.

Haath Pag Bandhayela Chhe (1970) and Je Nathi Te (1973) are collections of his absurd one-act plays.

He was also a painter. In 1972, his art exhibitions were held in Ahmedabad and Mumbai.

Awards
He received the Vali Gujarati Award in 2008. He received Kalapi Award in 1998.

See also
 List of Gujarati-language writers

References

External links 
 

1936 births
2008 deaths
Indian Muslims
Indian Sunni Muslims
20th-century Indian poets
People from Surat
Gujarati-language poets
Indian male poets
Poets from Gujarat
Indian calligraphers
20th-century Indian dramatists and playwrights
People from New Jersey
Dramatists and playwrights from Gujarat
20th-century Indian male writers